is a Japanese football player. He plays for Omiya Ardija.

Playing career
Masato Kojima joined Omiya Ardija in 2015.

Club statistics
Updated to 22 March 2018.

References

External links
Profile at Mito HollyHock
Profile at Omiya Ardija

1996 births
Living people
Association football people from Saitama Prefecture
Japanese footballers
J1 League players
J2 League players
J3 League players
Omiya Ardija players
J.League U-22 Selection players
Mito HollyHock players
Association football midfielders